Will and Dewitt is a Canadian flash-animated adventure television series starring a frog named Dewitt, and a human boy named Will as the main characters. It is produced by Cookie Jar Entertainment and Two Presidents Productions. It was first aired on September 22, 2007 on Kids' WB. The final episode was aired on May 3, 2008.

Plot
The show that focuses on Dewitt motivating Will to accomplish difficult tasks.

Characters

Main

 Will – Will is an 6-year-old fun-loving, shy and light-hearted boy. He has a younger sister named Kate. He also has a pet frog named Dewitt. Will is voiced by Connor Price.
 Dewitt – Dewitt is an anthropomorphic frog who can shift into any shape or size, usually as a visual aid to a joke he has just made. He is also a skilled impersonator. In each episode, he gives Will the support and motivation he needs to get through the challenges before him. Dewitt originally appeared and continues to appear on the packaging of Procter & Gamble's Kandoo personal care products. The frog pre-dated the TV show and was named Dewitt upon its creation. Dewitt is voiced by Richard Ian Cox.

Supporting

 Fred – Will's 10-year-old brother who thinks he's better than him. Fred is voiced by Billy Rosemberg.
 Kate – Will's 4-year-old younger sister who likes animals. She can get in the way of Will's challenges. Kate is voiced by Nissae Isen.
 Sandra – Will's female friend and sometimes rival, Sandra is a next-door neighbour of Will and Sam.
 Mom & Dad – Will, Kate, and Fred's parents are always nearby and ready to lend a hand if their children need it. They are fun, understanding and supportive. Mom is voiced by Katie Griffin, and Dad is voiced by Richard Binsley.
 Sam – Will's best friend, whose full name is "Samuel", and who is also a fan of Frogboy. He's also good at telling jokes. Sam is voiced by London Angelis.
 The Forest Animals – Those characters help Will & Dewitt with their challenges by singing about them. Wince, the yellow raccoon is voiced by Richard Binsley, Zipper, the brown mouse is voiced by Jen Gould, Shelley the turtle is voiced by Linda Ballantyne, and Karen Koi is voiced by Annick Obonsawin.

Episodes

Educational relevance
In the U.S., the show's educational elements have qualified it as an E/I show.

Will and Dewitt is a half-hour children's adver-edutainment series that supports the Kandoo line of children's hygiene products, formerly a sub-brand of Procter & Gamble's Pampers baby product line.

References

External links

2007 Canadian television series debuts
2008 Canadian television series endings
2000s Canadian animated television series
Canadian children's animated adventure television series
Canadian children's animated fantasy television series
Canadian children's animated musical television series
Canadian flash animated television series
English-language television shows
Fictional duos
Animated television series about children
Animated television series about frogs
Television series by Cookie Jar Entertainment
Kids' WB original shows
YTV (Canadian TV channel) original programming
Television series by DHX Media